The United Gorani Party is a Gorani political party in Kosovo.

History

The Unique Gorani Party was registered by the Kosovo Electoral Commission on 12 May 2014.

Representation

Since its founding the Unique Gorani Party has won a Gorani Minority reserved seat in the Assembly of the Republic of Kosovo twice in Kosovo Parliamentary Elections of 2017 and 2019. The Unique Gorani Party is part of Parliamentary Majority in the Assembly of the Republic of Kosovo and is represented in the Government of Kosovo with one Deputy Minister. At the local government level, taking part in the municipal elections in Municipality of Dragaš, the Unique Gorani Party has won 2 out of 27 seats of the local Assembly.

Election results

Parliamentary elections

See also
Gorani people
Gora (region)
Adem Hodža
Hamza Balje

References

Gorani people
Political parties of minorities in Kosovo
Political parties established in 2014